Emily Reed is an English singer who took part in A Song for Europe, the selection process for representing the United Kingdom in the Eurovision Song Contest 2003. She was one of four finalists, singing "Help Me". She finished second to the winning song "Cry Baby" by Jemini. "Help Me" brought in 64 points to the winning song's 68 points. Jemini went on to represent the UK and scoring "nul points" in the contest.

Results

In 2006, she was part of Daz Sampson's group in the 2006 UK entry to Eurovision in "Teenage Life", as one of the girl backing vocalists to Sampson, joining Holly, Leeanne, Ashlee and Gabriella. The other backing vocalists were just amateurs applying for the song. Reed was the only one with singing experience who replaced Jessica, an original qualifying amateur girl. Management had decided Jessica could not take part for various considerations, including her age and decided to take in Reed herself. The song finished 19th out of the 24 acts.

In 2009, she was the featured vocalist on Insight's single "Heaven Help Me Now".

References

External links

English women singers
Living people
Year of birth missing (living people)